Noyers-Missy was a short-lived commune in the department of Calvados, northwestern France. The commune was established on 1 January 2016 by merger of the former communes of Noyers-Bocage and Missy. On 1 January 2017, it was merged into the new commune Val d'Arry.

See also 
Communes of the Calvados department

References 

Former communes of Calvados (department)
Populated places established in 2016
2016 establishments in France